Ayşe Polat (born 19 October 1970) is a German-Kurdish film director, screenwriter and film producer.

Career 
In 1992 she releases the short film Fremdennacht, which is supported by the Hamburg Film Bureau. Her 1994 short film Ein Fest für Beyhan  wins several awards, including the WDR sponsorship prize. Gräfin Sophia Hatun (1997) also tours several international festivals and receives the Special Jury Prize at the Ankara International Film Festival.

Her feature film debut  (1999) toured numerous international festivals and partook in the international competition of Karlovy Vary and Tokyo. Polat received the award for best directorial debut at the Ankara International Film Festival.

Her second feature film En Garde (2004) was screened as the Locarno Film Festival opening film and received the Silver Leopard for Best Film and Best Actresses, Maria Kwiatkowsky and Pinar Erincin. In 2005, Polat received the German Critics Award for En Garde. 

In 2006, Polat directed her first theater work Otobüs at Berlin's Theater Hebbel am Ufer (HAU 2). The play deals with the kidnapping of a group of German package tourists in Turkey. 

Polat co-produced her third feature film LUKS GLÜCK. The tragicomedy tells the story of a Turkish family between Hamburg and Istanbul, whose life is thrown off course when they win the lottery. 

In 2013, her film Die Erbin, which she also produced, premiered at the International Film Festival Rotterdam. The film deals with the return of a young woman from Germany back to the home country of her deceased father.  

Her first documentary The Others is completed in 2016 and has its international premiere at DOK Leipzig.

Reception 
Polat belongs to the first wave of young Turkish filmmakers at the end of the nineties. Her Kurdish heritage allows the young filmmaker a different approach to themes of belonging and origin. As one of the few German filmmakers with a history of migration, she is represented at the retrospective of the 69th Berlin International Film Festival, which focuses on the filmmaking of female directors in the period from 1968 to 1999. 

In her cinematic work, Polat deals with themes of the search and loss of identity. Her work is associated with the Berlin School.

Being a director of films that belong to the so-called German-Turkish cinema, Ayşe Polat is particularly involved with the political relevance of a poiesis of seeing films, as it becomes most apparent when a minority position is placed in relation to the context of a hegemonic entertainment culture.

Filmography 
 Fremdennacht (1992), short
  (1994) short
 Gräfin Sophia Hatun (1997) short
  (1999)
  (2004)
 Luks Glück (2010)
  (2013)
 Die Anderen (2016)
 Tatort: Masken (2021)
 In the Blind Spot (2023)

Awards 
Federal Youth and Video Competition Award

 1991: Entfremdet

Award of the West German Broadcast

 1994: Ein Fest für Beyhan

Ankara International Film Festival

 1997: Jury Prize for Gräfin Sophia Hatun
 2000: Best Directorial Debut for Tour Abroad
 2005: Jury Prize for En Garde

International Film Festival Locarno

 2004: Silver Leopard for En Garde

Otto Sprenger Directing Award

 2004: En Garde

German Critics Award

 2005: Best Feature Film for En Garde

German Cinema New Talent Award

 2010: Category: Editing for Luk's Glück

Beyond Borders Documentary Film Festival

 2018: Best Sociopolitical Documentary for The Others

DOK. Leipzig

 2018 Ver.di Award for Solidarity, Humanity and Fairness for The Others

References

External links 
 

1970 births
Living people
Mass media people from Hamburg
People from Malatya
Free University of Berlin alumni
University of Bremen alumni
Turkish emigrants to West Germany
Kurdish film directors
Kurdish women film directors
Turkish film directors
Turkish women film directors